Aphnaeus orcas, the common highflier or common silver spot, is a butterfly in the family Lycaenidae. It is found in Senegal, the Gambia, Guinea-Bissau, Guinea, Sierra Leone, Liberia, Ivory Coast, Ghana, Nigeria (south and the Cross River loop), Cameroon, Gabon, the Republic of the Congo, Angola, the Central African Republic, the Democratic Republic of the Congo (Mongala, Uele, Tshopo, Tshuapa, Equateur, Sankuru and Lualaba), Uganda, western and south-western Kenya, Tanzania and Zambia. The habitat consists of forests.

Both sexes feed from flowers and males mud-puddle.

The larvae feed on Alchornea cordifolia, Albizia, Allophylus, Blighia, Loranthus, Macaranga, Olea, Paullinia, Rhus, Scolopia, Scutia and Uncaria species. They are attended by ants of the family Formicidae.

References

External links
Die Gross-Schmetterlinge der Erde 13: Die Afrikanischen Tagfalter. Plate XIII 69 c

Butterflies described in 1782
Aphnaeus
Taxa named by Dru Drury